To Be Loved by You may refer to:

 "To Be Loved by You" (Wynonna Judd song), a 1995 song by Wynonna
 "To Be Loved by You" (Parker McCollum song), a 2021 song by Parker McCollum